Charles Brendan Grandy (born March 5, 1974) is an American stand-up comedian, television writer and producer. He began his career on the television series The Daily Show with Jon Stewart, Saturday Night Live,  The Office, and Guys With Kids. Grandy has had a string of collaborations with actress and producer Mindy Kaling through The Mindy Project,  Champions, and Four Weddings and a Funeral. He is the son of former Love Boat star turned politician Fred Grandy.

Career 
After working as a stand-up comedian, Grandy turned to television writing and became a writer on Jon Stewart's The Daily Show in 2001. After his Daily Show stint, Grandy became a writer and producer on Saturday Night Live, where he worked until 2008. He worked on the Weekend Update sketch. In the same year, he joined the writing staff of the fifth season of the American version of The Office. At the beginning of the sixth season he became a co-producer and by the time the show entered its seventh season, he had become a supervising producer of the series. After the cancellation of his show, Guys With Kids, he joined his former Office cohort, Mindy Kaling, on the second season of her show, The Mindy Project, as a writer and co-executive producer. In 2018, Grandy and Kaling created the NBC show Champions. He served as an executive producer on Kaling's 2019 miniseries Four Weddings and a Funeral.

Writing credits

Personal life
Grandy married Sage Davis in July 2004. He is the son of actor and politician Fred Grandy and his first wife Jan (née Gough); his parents divorced in 1983. Grandy graduated from Harvard University.

Awards and nominations 
Grandy has won two Primetime Emmy Awards, one for The Daily Show the other for Saturday Night Live. In 2009 he received two Writers Guild of America award nominations, one for the fifth season of The Office and another for writing the episode Broke.

References

External links 

American male television writers
American television producers
Living people
1974 births
Harvard College alumni
Screenwriters from New York (state)
Writers from New York City
21st-century American screenwriters
21st-century American male writers